Actis may refer to:

Actis (mythology), a Heliadae in Greek mythology
Actis, California, an unincorporated community in Kern County, California, United States
Actis, a synonym of the butterfly genus Pilodeudorix
Actis Capital, a British private equity firm

People with the surname
Carlo Actis Dato (born 1952), Italian jazz saxophonist and composer

See also
ACTI